Sa'ar 5 is a class of Israeli Navy corvettes. They were Israeli designed using lessons learned from the s. Three Sa'ar 5 ships were built by Huntington Ingalls Industries (formerly Litton-Ingalls Shipbuilding Corporation of Pascagoula, Mississippi) for the Israeli Navy, based on Israeli designs.

They were the largest surface warships in Israel's naval fleet, although the Sa'ar 6-class corvette now being deployed are considerably larger. Although classified as "corvettes" due to their small size and crew of only 71, their weaponry and speed are almost comparable to that of a frigate. They are equipped with sonar, 2 triple torpedoes, 2 quadruple missile launchers, electronic warfare capabilities and decoys, a Close-in weapon system, 2 autocannon and a helipad and helicopter hangar.

Combat history
On 14 July 2006 during the 2006 Lebanon War, INS Hanit was struck by a Hezbollah-fired C-802 missile while patrolling 8.5 nm offshore of Beirut; the missile was Chinese-built with an upgraded Iranian radar seeker. The missile hit the corvette's unstealthy crane near the rear helicopter pad; the explosion holed the pad, set fire to fuel storage, and killed four crewmembers. The fire was extinguished after four hours and Hanit returned to Ashdod under its own power for three weeks of repairs.

The ship's radar system was not fully functional at the time, and both the ECM and the Barak anti-missile systems were in a two-minute stand-by mode. An officer ordered that the anti-missile defenses be switched off about an hour prior to the attack without notifying the captain. The decision took into account intelligence assessments that Hezbollah did not have the capability to hit Israeli warships. The partial sensor shutdowns were known by the officer responsible, but the captain was not informed.

The move was seen as a possible warning to Iran.

On 31 May 2010 INS Lahav and INS Hanit participated in the Gaza flotilla raid, meant to stop a convoy of ships from breaching the blockade of the Gaza Strip, along with the missile boat INS Nitzachon.

Ships
Three ships of the Sa'ar 5 class have been built:
 , launched February 1993
 , launched August 1993
 , launched March 1994

The ships' missile systems include: (i) anti-air capability with 1 x 32-cell vertical launch system (although it is possible to carry another), with Barak-1 and/or Barak-8 missiles of IAI and Rafael, and two four-cell Boeing Harpoon missile launchers.

Ship's guns are a Raytheon / General Dynamics MK15 Phalanx 20mm close-in weapon system (CIWS). Secondary guns included a pair of 20mm autocannon, although these were later replaced with 5-barrel 25mm Sea Vulcan 25 guns.

The main radar for the 1st and 3rd ship (INS Eilat and INS Hanit) is the Advanced Lightweight Phased Array (ALPHA) ELM-2258 by Elta, an AESA S-band multifunction rotating radar, with automatic track initiation at +120 km (for fighters) and +25 km (for missiles).

The main radar for the 2nd ship INS Lahav is the micro-AEGIS-style four-fixed-paneled S-band radar. In 2014 September 23, she was presented to the public with that new radar at Haifa naval base.

For undersea warfare, the EDO Corporation's Type-796 hull-mounted search-and-attack sonar.

Electronic warfare includes an AN/SLQ-25 Nixie towed torpedo decoy system, a radar warning receiver Elisra NS-9003/9005, and three Elbit Deseaver chaff decoys.

See also
 
 
 Israeli Navy

References

External links

 Naval Technology
 Global Security
 Hazegray
 Ha'aretz: 4 soldiers missing after naval vessel hit off Beirut coast

Corvette classes
 
Corvettes of the Israeli Navy